Deer Mountain is a summit in the U.S. state of Nevada.

Deer Mountain was named for the deer which roamed the area. A variant name is "Deer Creek Mountain".

References

Mountains of Elko County, Nevada